Joseph ben Judah ibn Aknin (1150 – c. 1220) was a Sephardic Jewish writer of numerous treatises, mostly on the Mishnah and the Talmud. He was born in Barcelona, but settled in Fes, where by his own admission he lived as a crypto-Jew. Though a native of Spain, his family had originated in North Africa.

Works 
In addition to an introduction to the Talmud in Arabic (Hebrew translation at Mevo ha-Talmud), and a treatise on Talmudic weights and measures, his surviving works include:
 Sefer ha Musar ("Book of Morality")
A commentary on the Pirkei Avot similar to that of Maimonides.
 Tibb al-Nufūs al-Salīma wa-Mu ʿālajat al-Nufūs al-Alīma ("The Hygiene of Healthy Souls and the Therapy of Ailing Souls")
A book on psychology, with a chapters on friendship, speech and silence, keeping a secret, lying, food and drink, asceticism, education, the needs and destiny of the soul, persecutions and the proper response to them, and repentance. The chapter on education argues that the study of logic and science should not be undertaken before the age of thirty, and only after a solid traditional education so that religious convictions should not be affected by philosophical doubts.
 Inkishāf al-asrar ważuhūr al-anwār ("The Divulgence of Mysteries and the Appearance of Lights")
A commentary on the Song of Songs, treating each verse at three levels: at the literal level, citing contemporary grammarians to explain every word on the scroll; at a rabbinical level, based on midrashic texts, symbolising the people of Israel's relationship with God; and at an allegorical level, describing the soul trying to unite itself with the intellect, supported by Jewish and Arab poets, and the philosophy of Al-Farabi and Avicenna.

 Risālat al-ibānah fi uṣūl al-diyānah ( "Clarification of the Fundamentals of Faith")   A book no longer in existence that discussed a man's freedom.
 A Hebrew translation of Al-Farabi's Kitab al-Musiqa al-Kabir (Great Book of Music)

Works which have been lost include Hukkim u-Mishpatim (a compendium of Jewish law), and a theological work Risalat al-Ibana fi Uṣul al-Diyana ("A Religious Clarification of Religious Fundamentals").

Ibn Aknin is known to have known Maimonides in North Africa, and draws on many of the same sources, sharing a similar outlook. But he is not the Joseph ben Judah to whom the Guide is addressed.

References 

 Colette Sirat, A History of Jewish Philosophy in the Middle Ages, pp. 207–8. Cambridge University Press, 1990. 
 Hava Lazarus-Yafeh, Judeo-Arabic Literature, 1977.

1150s births
1220s deaths
Year of birth uncertain
Year of death uncertain
Jewish writers
12th-century Arabic writers
13th-century Arabic writers
12th-century Catalan Jews
13th-century Catalan Jews
People from Barcelona